Karen Grønn-Hagen (27 November 1903  –  19 December 1982) was a Norwegian politician for the Centre Party.

She was born in Tynset.

She was elected to the Norwegian Parliament from Hedmark in 1961. From August to September 1963 she served as the Minister of Family and Consumer Affairs during the short-lived centre-right cabinet Lyng. During her stint as cabinet member her place in the Parliament was taken by Karstein Seland. Grønn-Hagen had previously served in the position of deputy representative during the term 1954–1957, but a year into this term she replaced the deceased Einar Frogner as a regular representative.

Grønn-Hagen was a member of Tynset municipality council from 1951 to 1959, and became deputy mayor in 1959–1960.

Notes

References

1903 births
1982 deaths
People from Tynset
Centre Party (Norway) politicians
Members of the Storting
Hedmark politicians
Ministers of Children, Equality and Social Inclusion of Norway
Women members of the Storting
20th-century Norwegian women politicians
20th-century Norwegian politicians
Women government ministers of Norway